Clelia Matania (28 March 1918 – 14 October 1981) was an Italian film and voice actress.

Life and career 
Born in London, the daughter of the Capri-born naturalized Briton painter Fortunino Matania (best known as Saturnino), Matania attended the Royal Academy of Dramatic Art and also followed courses of ballet, singing and music. When the family returned to Italy, she entered the company of the Arts Theater directed by Anton Giulio Bragaglia. In the second half of the thirties and during the war she was one of the most popular and requested young actresses of prose in Italy, then, from 1942, she also starred with some success in several revues. Her stage activity include works with Totò, Eduardo De Filippo and the musical comedy Enrico '61 that she also represented in England, first in Liverpool and then in London, also participating in a Royal Performance in the presence of the Royal Family.

Her film career mainly consists of supporting roles as a character actress; due to her perfect knowledge of English, Matania was also often required for the international productions set in Italy. She was also a very active voice actress.

Matania was married to painter Guido Odierna.

Selected filmography

Melody of My Heart (1936)
Night Ride (1937) - Lucia Spinelli
Departure (1938) - Lolò - la dattilografa
Inventiamo l'amore (1938) - Elsa
 The Sons of the Marquis Lucera (1939) - Soave
Naples Will Never Die (1939) - Rosinella
 Father For a Night (1939) - Luisa
Follie del secolo (1939) - Margot, la cameriera
The Silent Partner (1939)
La compagnia della teppa (1941) - Carolina Agudio
First Love (1941) - Silvia Redi
La fuggitiva (1941) - Lia Coppi
Honeymoon (1941) - Anna
Se io fossi onesto (1942) - Paola Englesh, loro figlia
A che servono questi quattrini? (1942) - Rachelina
Perdizione (1942)
After Casanova's Fashion (1942) - Maria Grazia
Notte di fiamme (1942)
Sempre più difficile (1943) - Cristina Turrisi
L'ippocampo (1945) - Francesca
Romulus and the Sabines (1945) - Rosina
Il marito povero (1946) - Giulia
 Farewell, My Beautiful Naples (1946) - Yvonne de Fleurette
L'isola del sogno (1947) - Carla, la soubrette
Giudicatemi! (1948)
 Eleven Men and a Ball (1948) - Clelia
Alarm Bells (1949) - Bianca
Angelo tra la folla (1950)
 The Transporter (1950) - Dolores Garcia
Strano appuntamento (1950)
Love and Blood (1951) - Gabriella
Shadows Over Naples (1951) - Gabriela
Seven Hours of Trouble (1951) - Angelina - moglie di Totò
Quo Vadis (1951) - Parmenida (uncredited)
Stasera sciopero (1951) - Marta
Never Take No for an Answer (1951) - Mrs. Strotti
 One Hundred Little Mothers (1952) - La direttrice Sampieri
Toto and the Women (1952) - La cameriera
I morti non pagano tasse (1952) - La signora Vecchietti
Terminal Station (1953) - Mother of annoying children (uncredited)
Man, Beast and Virtue (1953) - Grazia
Easy Years (1953) - Rosina De Francesco
Cavallina storna (1953) 
 The Beach (1954) - Albertocchi's Wife
Guai ai vinti (1954) -Teresa
Neapolitan Carousel (1955)
Les Hussards (1955) - Mme Luppi
I pinguini ci guardano (1956) - (voice)
I giorni più belli (1956) - La signora Valentini
War and Peace (1956) - Mademoiselle Geoges (uncredited)
Difendo il mio amore (1956) - Emma
Wives and Obscurities (1956) - Signora Zanarini
Roland the Mighty (1956) - La nutrice
The Monte Carlo Story (1956) - Sophia
Mamma sconosciuta (1956) - Giuliana
Cantando sotto le stelle (1956) - Fernando Pezzetti
Seven Hills of Rome (1957) - Beatrice
A Farewell to Arms (1957) - Hairdresser (uncredited)
Napoli, sole mio! (1958) - Margherita
Anna of Brooklyn (1958) - Camillina
La Fortuna Con L'effe Maiuscola (1959)
Il Medico Dei Pazzi (1959)
Rapina al quartiere Ovest (1960)
La garçonnière (1960) - Angelina
The Wastrel (1961) - Betsy
Five Golden Hours (1961) - Rosalia
Il carabiniere a cavallo (1961) - La madre di Letizia
Nefertiti, Queen of the Nile (1961) - Penaba
Pecado de amor (1961) - Sirvienta de Magda
Escapade in Florence (1962, TV Series) - Aunt Gisella
The Battle of the Villa Fiorita (1965) - Celestina
Perdono (1966) - Adelina
Nessuno mi può giudicare (1966) - Adelina
Chimera (1968) - Lina - the maid
Barbagia (1969) - Graziano's Mother
The Secret of Santa Vittoria (1969)
Just Before Nightfall (1971) - Mme Masson
Bequest to the Nation (1973) - Francesca
Don't Look Now (1973) - Wendy
Le farò da padre (1974) - Elisa
Vergine e di nome Maria (1975) - Anna, madre di Maria
Wanted: Babysitter (1975) - Old neighbour
L'Italia s'è rotta (1976) - La madre di Peppe
Bim Bum Bam (1981)

References

External links
 

1918 births
1981 deaths
Italian film actresses
Italian stage actresses
British film actresses
British stage actresses
British emigrants to Italy
20th-century Italian actresses
Alumni of RADA
Actresses from London
People of Campanian descent
20th-century English women
20th-century English people